Food Chemistry is a peer-reviewed scientific journal. It was established in 1976 and is published monthly by Elsevier.

External links 
 

Chemistry journals
Elsevier academic journals
English-language journals
Food chemistry
Food science journals
Publications established in 1976
Semi-monthly journals